Marsha K. Caddle is a politician and economist from Barbados, who is a Member of Parliament and the Minister of Finance, Economic Affairs and Investment.

Biography 
Caddle grew up in Haggatt Hall in St. Michael, Barbados. She attended Belmont Primary School and for secondary education, Harrison College. She studied Economics at the Universidad Católica Santo Domingo, and subsequently moved to postgraduate study at the University of Utah. She has also worked in Poverty Analysis and Measurement with the Oxford Poverty and Human Development Initiative. In 2006 she became a member of the International Association for Feminist Economics and the International Working Group on Gender, Macroeconomics and International Economics.

Prior to her work in parliament, Caddle held several roles in development, including as manager of the Economic Security and Rights programme of the United Nations Development Fund for Women Caribbean Office. She subsequently worked as Programme Manager, Poverty and Economic Security with the United Nations Development Programme (UNDP) and as governance strategy manager for the Caribbean Development Bank.

A member of the Barbados Labour Party, Caddle is the Member of Parliament for the St Michael South Central constituency. She was first elected to parliament on 26 May 2018 Barbados general election, unseating the then Tourism Minister Richard Sealy.

In 2021 Caddle led the delegation from Barbados to the COP 26 conference, since her ministerial role leads on climate crisis and climate finance. For Barbados, rising temperatures means increasingly severe weather, including hurricanes and drought. She has been outspoken about how the main driver of debt for Caribbean countries is the effect of the climate crisis.

Personal life 
Caddle married Abdul Mohamed in June 2021.

References

External links 

 Hon. Marsha K. Caddle, M.P 15th Sitting of The Honourable The House Of Assembly
Interview with the Hon. Marsha Caddle
Cop26’s ticking clock, an inside view – in pictures

Year of birth missing (living people)
Living people
Barbados Labour Party politicians
Members of the House of Assembly of Barbados
University of Utah alumni
People educated at Harrison College (Barbados)
21st-century Barbadian women politicians
21st-century Barbadian politicians
Economy ministers of Barbados
Finance ministers of Barbados
Women government ministers of Barbados